Paralacydes jeskei is a moth of the family Erebidae. It was described by Karl Grünberg in 1911. It is found in Botswana, Namibia and South Africa.

References

Spilosomina
Moths described in 1911